ABHD18 is a protein that in Homo sapiens is encoded by the ABHD18 gene.

Gene 
ABHD18 is found on the positive strand of the human genome at 4q28.2. It is 74.4 kbp. The gene contains 17 exons. The longest mRNA transcript is composed of 13 exons and is 2200 base pairs.

Homology

Orthologs
Many orthologs to human ABHD18 have been discovered, with the most distant ortholog with high (over 90%) coverage is found in rice Oryza sativa. The protein is not found in fungi. Bacteria of the order Myxobacteria and genus Chitinimonas contain orthologous regions to the C4orf29 protein. The few bacterial homologs indicate a horizontal gene transfer event. The domain of unknown function, DUF2048, is conserved throughout orthologs.

Protein 
ABHD18 codes a 414 amino acid sequence of 46.9 kDa in humans. The predicted isoelectric point is 9.37. The domain of unknown function, DUF2048, is found from amino acid residues 25 to 414 in the precursor C4orf29 protein. This domain is part of the alpha/beta hydrolase superfamily, which comprises enzymes that catalyze fat metabolism. Predicted post-translational modifications include glycosylation at residues Ser287 and Ser319  and sumoylation at the motifs Phe240 to Gly243, Ala377 to Asp340, and Phe408 to Gly411.

Expression 
The protein product of ABHD18 in humans is predicted to be a secreted product. It is ubiquitously expressed at low to moderate levels. In humans, the protein is found at high levels the digestive tract and parathyroid gland. The homologous mouse protein 3110057O12Rik is expressed at high levels in the granule layer of the cerebellum.

Clinical significance 
ABHD18 contains highly variable numbers of Alu repeats. A low number of Alu repeats in the human ABHD18 protein is associated with increase prevalence of hepatocellular carcinoma (HCC) in Asian populations. This information is used as a genetic marker to determine genetic risk of HCC. 
Swine muscle transcriptome analysis indicates high expression of ABHD18 in swine with extreme low levels of fatty acid composition.

References